The Kid from Spain is a 1932 American pre-Code film directed by Leo McCarey. Harry Ruby and Bert Kalmar composed the songs, and Busby Berkeley is credited with creating and directing the film's musical scenes. It was Jane Wyman's film debut.

Plot

Cast
Eddie Cantor as Eddie Williams
Lyda Roberti as Rosalie
Robert Young as Ricardo
Ruth Hall as Anita Gomez
John Miljan as Pancho
Noah Beery, Sr. as Alonzo Gomez
J. Carrol Naish as Pedro
Robert Emmett O'Connor as Detective Crawford
Stanley Fields as Jose
Paul Porcasi as Gonzales
Sidney Franklin as himself – American Matador
Also appearing in uncredited roles are Harry C. Bradley, Teresa Maxwell-Conover, Eduardo de Castro, Harry Gribbon, Paul Panzer, Julian Rivero, Walter Walker, Leo Willis, Tammany Young, and the stock company of the Goldwyn Girls, consisting at that time of Betty Grable, Paulette Goddard, Toby Wing, Jane Wyman, Althea Henley, Dorothy Coonan Wellman, Shirley Chambers, and Lynn Browning.

References

External links

Onion A/V Club review

1932 films
1932 comedy films
Bullfighting films
Samuel Goldwyn Productions films
Films directed by Leo McCarey
American comedy films
American black-and-white films
1930s English-language films
1930s American films
Goldwyn Girls